Toni Markus Nieminen (born 31 May 1975) is a Finnish former ski jumper who competed from 1991 to 2004, with a brief comeback in 2016. He is one of the most successful ski jumpers from Finland, having won both the World Cup overall title and the Four Hills Tournament in 1992, and three medals at the 1992 Winter Olympics. He remains the youngest ever Winter Olympic gold medalist, at 16 years and 261 days.

Career
Nieminen's biggest success came in his first World Cup season in 1991/92. At the time, the transition from the parallel style to the V-style was taking place and Nieminen was one of the first to master the new technique.

Nieminen took his first World Cup victory in Thunder Bay, in December 1991. Then he went on to win the Four Hills Tournament with 3 victories and one 2nd place. At the 1992 Winter Olympics in Albertville, Nieminen won the large hill and the Team large hill, placing third in the normal hill. In the World Cup, Nieminen took a total of 8 victories securing also the overall title. Additionally, Nieminen won the World Junior Championship in both the Individual and the Team competitions. Nieminen was chosen as the Finnish Sports Personality of the Year 1992.

In the following seasons, Nieminen showed only glimpses of his great talent. In 1994, he became the first ever ski jumper to break the 200 metre barrier at Planica, with a world record of 203 m. Out of his total of 9 individual World Cup victories, only one came after the 1991/92 season, in Kuopio 1995. In World Cup team competitions, Nieminen scored one victory, in Villach 2001.

After retiring from ski jumping in 2004, Nieminen has worked as a sports commentator for Finnish MTV3. He has also competed as a driver in harness racing.

Nieminen made a comeback on 30 January 2016 finishing 17th in normal hill Finnish championship. Nieminen said that his target is to make a comeback to the World Cup.

World Cup

Standings

Wins

Ski jumping world record
First standing jump over 200 metres in history.

References

External links

1975 births
Living people
Sportspeople from Lahti
Finnish male ski jumpers
Ski jumpers at the 1992 Winter Olympics
Ski jumpers at the 2002 Winter Olympics
Holmenkollen Ski Festival winners
Olympic ski jumpers of Finland
Olympic gold medalists for Finland
Olympic bronze medalists for Finland
Olympic medalists in ski jumping
Medalists at the 1992 Winter Olympics
Finnish harness racers
World record setters in ski flying
20th-century Finnish people
21st-century Finnish people